Mir Ahmadan Khan Bugti  is a Pakistani politician who was a member of the National Assembly of Pakistan from 2008 to 2013.

Political career
He was elected to the National Assembly of Pakistan from Constituency NA-265 (Sibi-cum-Kohlu-cum-Dera Bugti-cum-Herna) as a candidate of Pakistan Muslim League (Q) (PML-Q) in 2008 Pakistani general election. He received 56,715 votes and defeated Mir Dostain Khan Domki.

He ran for the seat of the National Assembly from Constituency NA-265 (Sibi-cum-Kohlu-cum-Dera Bugti- cum-Harani) as a candidate of PML-Q in 2013 Pakistani general election but was unsuccessful. He received 8,246 votes and lost the seat to Mir Dostain Khan Domki.

References

Living people
Pakistani MNAs 2008–2013
Year of birth missing (living people)